City of Hope may refer to:
City of Hope (film), a 1991 film taking place in fictitious Hudson City, New Jersey
City of Hope National Medical Center, a cancer center in Duarte, California
 City of Hope (charity), the medical center's charity
City of Hope, a song by Journey, from Eclipse, 2011

See also 
 Hope (disambiguation)#Places